Posta Fibreno (locally ) is a comune (municipality) in the Province of Frosinone in the Italian region Lazio, located about  east of Rome and about  east of Frosinone. 
 
Posta Fibreno borders the following municipalities: Alvito, Broccostella, Campoli Appennino, Fontechiari, Vicalvi.

In 1927, following the reorganization of provincial circumscriptions established by royal decree no. 1 of January 2 1927, by the will of the fascist government, when the province of Frosinone was established, Posta Fibreno, as a locality of Vicalvi, passed from Caserta province to that of Frosinone. In 1957, with the law of 5 March 1957 n. 91, left the territory of Vicalvi.

Main sights
Lake of Posta Fibreno
Natural reserve Lago di Posta Fibreno

References

External links

Official website

Cities and towns in Lazio